Dolno Konjsko is a village in the municipality of Ohrid, North Macedonia. It is located 7km from Ohrid and it is considered as a tourist location, having a lot of hotels and restaurants nearby

Demographics
According to the 2002 census, the village had a total of 551 inhabitants. Ethnic groups in the village include:

Macedonians 551

References

Villages in Ohrid Municipality